The Monastery of Nuestra Señora de Valvanera (Spanish: Monasterio de Nuestra Señora de Valvanera) is a monastery located in Anguiano, Spain. It was declared Bien de Interés Cultural in 2003.

References 

Bien de Interés Cultural landmarks in La Rioja (Spain)